The Sélune is an 85 km long river in the Manche department, Normandy, France, beginning near Saint-Cyr-du-Bailleul. It empties into the bay of Mont Saint-Michel (part of the English Channel) near Avranches, close to the mouth of the Sée river. Other towns along the Sélune are Barenton, Saint-Hilaire-du-Harcouët and Ducey.

References

Rivers of France
Rivers of Normandy
Rivers of Manche
0Selune